Calyssa Rae Davidson (born December 27, 1989) is an American violinist.  She is the daughter of Emmy Award winning actor Doug Davidson and actress Cindy Fisher.

Education
Davidson was born in Beverly Hills, California.  In 2006, she dropped out of Dos Pueblos High School to purse a music career, completing her General Educational Development (GED) requirements at Santa Barbara City College graduating ahead of her class. Whilst at Santa Barbara City College, she studied the violin at the Colburn School in Los Angeles, California.  She went on to earn her Bachelor of Music Degree in Violin Performance and her Master's Degree in both Violin Performance and Composition for Screen from the Royal College of Music in London, England.

Career

Davidson worked and appeared in Zac Efron's film, 17 Again.  She can also be seen in rock and roll legend Rick Springfield's music video, "Christmas With You".

At the age of 16, she began recording solo violin for numerous bands, groups and commercials in her hometown of Santa Barbara, California, including the theme for the Santa Barbara International Film Festival.

Davidson played alongside Rick Springfield once again for the Holiday Celebration on Ice in Little Rock, Arkansas before a sold-out Verizon Arena. Also featured was classic rock band REO Speedwagon. The concert was filmed and then aired later on NBC nationwide and was rebroadcast on five other networks.

In late 2008, Davidson was offered a role on the Disney Channel series JONAS, but turned it down when producers insisted on the character playing the cello instead of the violin.  Despite declining the job, Davidson was asked to perform for the cast and crew on the set of JONAS.

Music videos
 "Christmas with You" – Rick Springfield

Discography
2007:  "Eye and Brain" – CD Recording Solo Violin
2008: "SPARO" – CD Recording Solo Violin
2009: "Carmelo" – CD Recording Solo Violin
2010: Goodbye Elliott – CD Recording Lead Violin
2011: Grover Anderson – CD Recording Lead Violin
2013: Roo Panes – CD Recording Solo Violin
2016: NORD by Ezra Axelrod – EP Recording Lead Violin
2020: After Midnight by Gareth Murphy – Single Release Solo Violin
2021: Paradise with Julia Thomsen – CD Recording Solo Violin

Filmography

Acting

Appearances

Theatre

Her instruments
Her instruments include a 19th-century, Italian violin made by Francesco Covi, and an electric violin, handcrafted and custom made for Davidson by T.B. of the UK.

References

1989 births
Living people
American violinists
21st-century violinists